Phoenicopterus is a genus of birds in the flamingo family Phoenicopteridae.

Taxonomy
The genus Phoenicopterus was introduced in 1758 by the Swedish naturalist Carl Linnaeus in the tenth edition of his Systema Naturae to accommodate a single species, the American flamingo Phoenicopterus ruber. The genus name is Latin for "flamingo".

Species
The genus contains three extant species:

References

Phoenicopterus
Taxa named by Carl Linnaeus
Bird genera